The Volkswagen Viloran is a minivan produced by SAIC Volkswagen since 2020. It is the largest vehicle built on the MQB platform.

Overview

The Volkswagen Viloran was unveiled at the 2019 Guangzhou Auto Show, and went on sale in China in April 2020.

The Viloran has an 2.0-litre turbocharged inline-4 gasoline engine, offered in 186 hp and 220 hp versions. The Viloran was offered with front-wheel drive and a 7-speed DSG automatic gearbox. The Viloran is currently sold in trim levels known as 330TSI Deluxe, 330TSI Business, 380TSI Premium and 380TSI Ultimate.

Powertrain

References

External links 

 Official website

Viloran
Minivans
Front-wheel-drive vehicles
Cars introduced in 2020
Cars of China